Haruto Dam  is a gravity dam located in Kochi Prefecture in Japan. The dam is used for flood control and water supply. The catchment area of the dam is 0.8 km2. The dam impounds about 10  ha of land when full and can store 630 thousand cubic meters of water. The construction of the dam was started on 1994.

See also
List of dams in Japan

References

Dams in Kōchi Prefecture